Mortal Kombat is the series of comic books published by Malibu Comics based on the Mortal Kombat video games series license between 1994 and 1995. While the comic books by Midway Games depict the games' official storyline, Malibu's story arcs are official publishings of the game providing alternative scenarios for the early Mortal Kombat series, thus favouring the "what if" theories. The series also features several original characters, mostly exclusive to it. It was published by Trielle Komix in Australia.

Overview 
The Malibu comic books, almost all of them written by Charles Marshall, were a sort of "re-imagining" of the Mortal Kombat franchise as numerous details were altered. Characters with no particularly defined backstory at the time (e.g., Smoke and Jade, who were paired up in the comics) were radically different when comparing their comic book appearances to their in-game appearances. In addition, certain characters were tweaked, mostly for the sake of the plot. For example, in Mortal Kombat II, Baraka is subservient to Shao Kahn and follows his orders without question. In the comics, however, he joins an alliance with Kung Lao, Kitana, and Sub-Zero, among others, who wish to bring Kahn down.

Throughout the Malibu series, several concepts are raised that, while not always part of the game's official storyline, are, in fact, part of the "what if" hyperextension of the game:

 It is revealed (just as it was in MKII) that Mileena was specifically designed by Shang Tsung, through sorcery, for Kahn as an imperfect clone of Kitana. However, despite being created artificially, Mileena considers herself to be "Shao Kahn's true daughter" and refers to herself in this way throughout the series, even after she learns the truth.  
 Kung Lao and Kitana share a love relationship instead of the more canonic relationship between Kitana and Liu Kang in the later games.  
 Johnny Cage and Sonya Blade also have a relationship in the series, which they have only in the much later games.  
 Raiden does not appear to take an active part in the second Mortal Kombat tournament. This idea would be used again during the Mortal Kombat film and the retconned story of MKII in Mortal Kombat: Shaolin Monks.  
 Sonya, who absolutely hated Kano and did all she could to ensure his capture—if not his death—becomes fully focused on aiding her friends and Raiden, and even shares a rivalry with Mileena, who tries to kill her on many occasions. 
 Scorpion wants to kill not only Sub-Zero in revenge for killing him, but also his family and his clan; which was not his original intention. 
 Sub-Zero's own treatment in the Malibu comics is unusual. In the games, the original Sub-Zero had been killed early on (prior to Mortal Kombat II), turning into the wraith Noob Saibot, and substituted by his younger brother. However, the older Sub-Zero is portrayed prominently throughout the entire run of the comic book series; while the younger brother makes only a small appearance in the last page of the Tournament Edition II issue. In the series, the older Sub-Zero has the traits of both himself and his brother. For instance, in the beginning, he is loyal to the Lin Kuei and always speaks highly of his clan; yet later in the story he becomes more humane and, instead of being a ruthless assassin, he assists Kitana, Kung Lao, Liu Kang, and their friends. He is portrayed as heroic (in contrast to the original Sub-Zero's soul being tainted in the games), while Scorpion is made to look purely evil (as opposed to his neutral alignment in the games). On the other hand, Noob Saibot is not mentioned or featured in any of the comics except in a special Baraka issue, where he shows up in a small role as a completely separate character (at the time, his identity as the original Sub-Zero was yet to be established in the games). The final issue sees the new Sub-Zero rise to avenge the death of his brother—which largely brings things closer to the game.

Publication

Mortal Kombat: Blood & Thunder 

 Untitled (penciled by Patrick Rolo, inked by Scott Reed and Bobby Rae)
 Light and Darkness (penciled by Patrick Rolo, inked by Bobby Rae)
 A Slow Boat to China (penciled by Patrick Rolo, inked by Bobby Rae and Larry Welch)
 The Art of War (penciled by Patrick Rolo, inked by Larry Welch)
 Kombat Zones (penciled by Patrick Rolo, inked by Larry Welch)
 Tao (penciled by Kiki Chansamone, inked by Bruce McCorkindale)
 Mortal Mayhem (penciled by Patrick Rolo)

The Blood & Thunder story arc depicts the early Mortal Kombat series in greater detail, yet it also uses the "what if" theme extensively. The storyline, in addition to following the structure of the video game, also creates a storyline of its own. Blood & Thunder focuses on one primary source of power, which is a mythical book known as the Tao Te Zhan which, when opened, can unleash greater power than anyone can imagine. Originally, there were many, but over the years in which the powers of each book were unlocked and abused, the Elder Gods destroyed each separate book and placed all its previous powers into the one book and devised a powerful spell which was to keep the book permanently closed and placed it somewhere in the mountains, never to be found again. The problem with Tao Te Zhan is that it requires a great power to break the spell keeping it closed and the answers to seven riddles to unlock the great power. Each solved riddle advances to the next page and is answered by various warriors, specifically Sub-Zero, Scorpion, Liu Kang, Johnny Cage and Sonya. Sub-Zero answers two riddles (the rest only have answered one) and at some stage of their adventures they try to unlock the book's power. The books' last riddle is solved by Goro, but Raiden and Shang Tsung join forces to strip Goro of his newfound power.

Mortal Kombat: Battlewave 

 Where The Wild Things Are (penciled by Patrick Rolo, inked by Scott Reed and Bobby Rae)
 A Fighting Chance (penciled by Vinton Heuck, inked by David Mowry and Scott Reed)
 No Guts, No Glory (penciled by Patrick Rolo, inked by Richard Emond)
 Days of Thunder, Nights of Pain (penciled by Patrick Rolo, inked by David Mowry)
 The Killing Fields (penciled by Vinton Heuck, inked by David Mowry)
 Death Moves (penciled by Keith Conroy and Vinton Heuck, inked by David Mowry and Jack Snider)

Mortal Kombat: Goro, Prince of Pain 

 Stranger in a Strange Land (penciled by Roy Burdine, inked by Jack Snider)
 Down and Out in Outworld (penciled by Roy Burdine, inked by Jack Snider and Scott Reed)
 Armed and Dangerous (penciled by Kiki Chansamone, inked by Bruce McCorkindale)

The Prince of Pain trilogy revolves around the storyline elements of chaos and order, the themes later officially introduced in the video game Mortal Kombat: Deception. The story is starred by Goro and the possible reason why he disappeared from the first game's tournament during the battle against Liu Kang, Sonya and the others. He appears in Earth and is led to Zaggot, the God of Chaos, who is the responsible of Goro's disappearance from Outworld. This story continues in Blood & Thunder storyline.

Mortal Kombat: Raiden & Kano 

 Eye of the Storm (penciled by Kiki Chansamone, inked by Abraham Madison)
 The Evil that Men Do (penciled by Darryl Cobbs, inked by David Mowry)
 When Part the Heavens (penciled Kiki Chansamone, inked by Abraham Madison)

Mortal Kombat: Tournament Edition 

 Tournament Edition: With Friends Like These... (penciled by Patrick Rolo, inked by Abraham Madison and Larry Welch)
 Tournament Edition II: A Cold Day in Hell (penciled by Patrick Rolo, inked by Abraham Madison)

Mortal Kombat: U.S. Special Forces 
This comic is not related to the later video game Mortal Kombat: Special Forces.

 Secret Treasures & Kano in "Break Out" (written by Mark Paniccia, penciled by Patrick Rolo, inked by Abraham Madison)
 Secret Treasures II (written by Mark Paniccia, penciled by Patrick Rolo, inked by Abraham Madison)

Character specials 

 Baraka: Babality (penciled by Vinton Heuck, inked by Abraham Madison, cover by Scott Christian Sava)
 Kitana and Mileena: Sister Act (penciled by Greg Horn, inked by Larry Welch, cover by Scott Barnett)
 Kung Lao: Rising Son (penciled by Tim Divar, inked by Abraham Madison)

Original characters 
 Abacus: Lord Abacus is a god of order, featured in the Goro: Prince of Pain miniseries. Residing in the Library of Order, he witnesses the chaotic scheming of his brother Zaggot unfold, yet refuses to respond physically for fear of producing further chaos, thus feeding his rival. This course of action alters, however, when Abacus encounters Goro and presents to him a weapon forged of order. Abacus is finally seen versing Zaggot in a game of chess. He is accompanied by the librarian Miss Bishop, who endlessly aids him in maintaining the occurrences of the universe.
 Bo: Bo is introduced in the second issue of Battlewave as Johnny Cage's personal bodyguard sent by Cage to protect Liu Kang. Massive in size, he first appeared as Liu Kang was taking a beating from Goro, from whom Bo was able to absorb a direct punch with little effect; without his intervention, Liu Kang would almost certainly have been killed. During the course of events in the series, Bo received a broken arm yet, in Tournament Edition II, he still managed to defeat Reptile with only his good arm. Deciding he didn't know enough about Outworld to continue with Shao Kahn's "contest," he instead spent the rest of the tournament by sitting on the unconscious Reptile and keeping him pinned to the ground.
 Gorbak: King Gorbak, ruler of the subterranean Shokan province of Outworld (specifically Kuatan), made his official debut in the official Mortal Kombat II Collector's Edition comic book, in which he expresses his outrage to Shao Kahn at his son Goro's death at the hands of a Shaolin monk (Liu Kang), and then demands Shang Tsung's execution as compensation. However, Tsung talks his way out of his imminent demise by conceiving another means of invading Earthrealm through twisting the rules of the tournament, leading Gorbak to offer a new Shokan allegiance to the Outworld throne: Kintaro. In the Malibu canon, Gorbak is featured in Battlewave #1 and #6. His part in the storyline alters between his two appearances; in the first issue, Gorbak's role mirrors that of the aforementioned MKII comic, but in the sixth issue, he attends the would-be wedding of Shao Kahn and Sonya (under mind control by Kahn). Gorbak also made an appearance in the animated film Mortal Kombat: The Journey Begins and is referenced briefly in Jeff Rovin's 1995 novel.
 Grum: Grum is a Shokan ruler of the Outworld province of Katala, briefly featured only in Blood & Thunder #2. He wields six sets of nunchaku with his six hands but is quickly dispatched by Sub-Zero from a simple freeze and flying-kick combination.
 Hydro: Sub-Zero's fellow Lin Kuei companion, Hydro had the ability to control water that was capable of freezing opponents upon contact. He was depicted in the Blood & Thunder series as younger than Sub-Zero yet a respectable fighter in his own right, but he was killed in Outworld by Scorpion in issue #4 as part of the latter's ongoing vendetta against Sub-Zero. Hydro also made an appearance in Mortal Kombat: Legacy, portrayed therein as an early version of the Lin Kuei's fledgling cybernetic-ninja program, unit LK 1V1, and is used to demonstrate Cyrax and Sektor's superior abilities. This version of Hydro displays the skills similar to other Lin Kuei cyborgs, such as conducting electricity.
 Lance: Lance was Sonya's Special Forces partner (assuming the role of a similar character, Sparky, who had appeared in the 1992 Midway comic based on the original MK game) who assisted her bid to capture Kano. He sported an artificial bionic arm - which served as an inspiration for Jax's metal implants in Mortal Kombat 3 - which had the ability to extend and conduct electricity. Kano defeats Lance and then performs his heart-rip Fatality during the opening bout of the MK tournament in the second issue of Blood & Thunder.
 Siang: A combination of twin Shaolin fighting monks Sing and Sang, who had the ability to merge their bodies to form a single powerful warrior. He was considered to be the greatest champion of the Order of Light (of which Liu Kang was also a member) and was sent as their representative to participate in the MK tournament. They saw their only action in Blood & Thunder #3, when Siang attempted to attack Goro while he and the other Kombatants were imprisoned in Shang Tsung's dungeon, but they were soon forcefully ripped apart and killed by Goro. However, in the Battlewave miniseries, it was revealed that Sang had actually survived Goro's attack. Therefore, Sang joined with the deceased Sing once more to form Siang, this time on a permanent basis. Siang was controlled by Shao Kahn due to his Deathstone, a special gem that had the power to control the dead. Because Siang was only half-dead, he maintained a mind of his own and managed to crash the wedding between Shao Kahn and Sonya, yet remained under Kahn's control. In a mercy killing, Siang is slain by Scorpion through impaling the warrior's heart with his spear, then the Deathstone is destroyed.
 Sylence: Sylence appeared only in the Special Forces miniseries. She was a member of the Special Forces, with pale skin, purple hair, and solid white eyes, and her weapon of choice was a push dagger. 
 The Kombatant: The Kombatant was a multi-limbed all-powerful creation of sorcery, first seen at the very end of the first issue of the Goro: Prince of Pain miniseries. Created by Zaggot, it is imbued with the combined strengths and certain physical attributes of the original seven Kombatants along with Shang Tsung and Goro, resulting in a seemingly indestructible being. Upon Goro's defeat, the Kombatant is ambushed in issue #2 by Baraka, Kitana, Mileena and Reptile, all of which are easily defeated, but Baraka manages to sever its upper left arm, which then mysteriously reappeared in the next installment with no explanation. The Kombatant meets its demise when Goro easily disintegrates it with a magically-crafted machine gun bestowed upon him by Abacus.
 Zaggot: Lord Zaggot is a god of chaos and the evil brother of Abacus, featured in the Goro: Prince of Pain miniseries. He receives his sinister strengths through the disruption of events in the universe. His companion is a talking crow named Rook. Zaggot found it necessary to create the Kombatant once proposing the position to Goro, receiving refusal. Later, Zaggot reveals his true form to Goro for purposes of intimidation, only to be swallowed by Goro when the lack of ensuing chaos causes the god to shrink in size. He is later seen playing a game of chess against Abacus.

Reception 
Malibu canceled their line after ten months and 26 issues (published in several mini-series) due to increasingly low sales. Dustin Quillen of 1UP.com featured the Malibu comics in his 2011 article "The Top Ten Times Mortal Kombat Went Wrong", opining it suffers from "sloppy artwork, a truly baffling sense of human anatomy, and strange lapses in continuity."

References

External links 

 Mortal Kombat at Comic Vine

1994 comics debuts
1995 comics endings
Comics based on video games
Malibu Comics titles
Marvel Comics titles
Martial arts comics
Science fantasy comics
Works based on Mortal Kombat